Timolean "Thomas" Lefousi (born 5 May 1972) is a Greek male alpine skier. He competed at the 1992 Winter Olympics. He is also the younger brother of fellow Greek alpine skier, Thomai Lefousi.

References 

1972 births
Living people
Greek male alpine skiers
Olympic alpine skiers of Greece
Alpine skiers at the 1992 Winter Olympics
Sportspeople from Naousa, Imathia